Mir Younus Aziz Zehri is a Pakistani politician who has been a member of the Provincial Assembly of the Balochistan since August 2018.

Political career
He was elected to the Provincial Assembly of the Balochistan as a candidate of Muttahida Majlis-e-Amal (MMA) from Constituency PB-39 (Khuzdar-II) in 2018 Pakistani general election. Following his successful election, MMA nominated him for the office of Chief Minister of Balochistan. On 18 August 2018, he received 20 votes and lost the seat to Jam Kamal Khan who secured 39 votes.

References

Living people
Politicians from Balochistan, Pakistan
Muttahida Majlis-e-Amal MPAs (Balochistan)
Year of birth missing (living people)